Sayaf Al Korbi (Arabic:سياف الكربي; born 14 September 1991) is a Qatari footballer who currently plays for Al Kharaitiyat as a midfielder . He is a graduate of Qatar's Aspire Academy.

References

1991 births
Living people
Qatari footballers
Al-Rayyan SC players
Al-Sailiya SC players
El Jaish SC players
Al Kharaitiyat SC players
Aspire Academy (Qatar) players
Qatar Stars League players
Qatari Second Division players
Association football midfielders